Any Love is the sixth studio album by American singer Luther Vandross. It was released by Epic Records on September 20, 1988 in the United States. Produced by Vandross and Marcus Miller, the album features a cover of Major Harris' hit single "Love Won't Let Me Wait" as well as "The Second Time Around," a re-recording of a song featured on Vandross's band Luther's 1976 album of the same name.

The album reached at number nine on the US Billboard 200 and peaked at number three on the UK Albums Chart, also reaching the top position on the US Top R&B/Hip-Hop Albums. It was eventually certified platinum by the Recording Industry Association of America  (RIAA) and silver by the British Phonographic Industry (BPI). At the 1989 Grammy Awards, Any Love was nominated for Best R&B Vocal Performance, Male, while its title track was nominated for Best R&B Song. Also, "She Won't Talk to Me" received a nomination for Best R&B Vocal Performance, Male in 1990.

Critical reception

Allmusic editor Ron Wynn noted that while "there were some who felt that Vandross suffered a slight slump when this album only reached the platinum level after two consecutive double-platinum winners, [...] "Here And Now" was a huge smash, and by now the pop crowd was fully aware of Vandross' vocal charms and allure. "She Won't Talk To Me" was a bit on the posturing side, but still managed to do decently, while there were also fine album cuts like "I Wonder" and "Are You Gonna Love Me."." 
Connie Johnson from The Los Angeles Times wrote that "Vandross’ music never touches on the global, political concerns of Stevie Wonder’s, but Vandross travels across the emotional terrain of the heart in a way that has made him as major a talent. What you get in his music are elements of sadness, loneliness and sensitivity that few other male vocal stylists of the day express as convincingly." Rolling Stone critic Rob Hoerburger felt that "there’s no question that Any Love is as masterful an album as Vandross has made; it’s probably only likable, though, for those who get off on severe bouts of melancholia."

Track listing 
All tracks produced by Luther Vandross and Marcus Miller.

Personnel
Credits adapted from the album's liner notes.

Performers and musicians

 Luther Vandross – lead vocals (1-9), backing vocals (1, 4, 5, 7), arrangements (8)
 Nat Adderley Jr. – keyboards (1, 6, 9), synthesizers (1, 6, 9), arrangements (1, 6), drum programming (6)
 Marcus Miller – synthesizers (1-5, 7, 8), keyboards (2, 4, 5, 7, 8), bass (2, 4-9), arrangements (2-5, 7, 8), drum programming (6)
 Jason Miles – programming (1-9)
 David Gamson – keyboards (3, 4), synthesizers (3, 4), arrangements (3, 4)
 Paul Jackson Jr. – guitar (1-9)
 Doc Powell – guitar (6)
 Buddy Williams – drums (1-4, 6-9)
 Paulinho da Costa – percussion (1-4, 6, 7, 8)
 Amy Knoles – timpani (6)
 Kirk Whalum – soprano saxophone (6)
 George Young – soprano saxophone (9)
 Hubert Eaves III – arrangements (2)
 Paul Riser – arrangements (9)
 Alfred Brown – music contractor (9)
 Lisa Fischer – backing vocals (1-4, 6, 7, 9)
 James Ingram – backing vocals (1)
 David Lasley – backing vocals (1)
 Michael Lovesmith – backing vocals (1, 2)
 Kevin Owens – backing vocals (1, 2, 4, 7)
 Mark Stevens – backing vocals (1, 2)
 Darryl Tookes – backing vocals (1)
 Tawatha Agee – backing vocals (2, 3, 4, 7)
 Cissy Houston – backing vocals (2, 3, 4, 6, 7)
 Paulette McWilliams – backing vocals (2, 3, 4, 6, 7, 9)
 Fonzi Thornton – backing vocals (2, 4, 7)
 Brenda White King – backing vocals (2, 3, 4, 6, 7)
 Michelle Cobbs – backing vocals (4)
 Anthony Hinton – backing vocals (9)
 Theresa V. Reed – backing vocals (9)
 Diane Sumler – backing vocals (9)
 Christine Wiltshire – backing vocals (9)

Horns on "The Second Time Around"

 Jerome Ashby
 Peter Gordon
 Harold Jones
 Dave Tofani
 Randy Brecker
 Jon Faddis
 John Miller
 Alan Rubin
 Homer Mensch

Technical

 Marcus Miller – producer
 Luther Vandross – producer, vocal arrangements
 Ray Bardani – engineer, mixing
 Denise Brown – additional engineer
 Brendan Fenton – additional engineer
 Mary Frengen – additional engineer
 Micah Goldberg – additional engineer
 Peter Grammatico – additional engineer
 Michael White – additional engineer
 Debi Cornish – assistant engineer 
 Marc DeSisto – mix assistant
 Fred Bova – technician 
 Michael Morengell – technician
 Gary Myerberg – technician
 Greg Calbi – mastering at Sterling Sound (New York, NY).
 Fonzi Thornton – vocal contractor
 Marsha K. Burns – production coordinator 
 Elijah Reeder – personal assistance
 George Corsillo – art direction, design 
 Matthew Rolston – photography

Charts

Weekly charts

Year-end charts

Certifications

See also 
 List of number-one R&B albums of 1988 (U.S.)

References 

1988 albums
Epic Records albums
Luther Vandross albums
Albums produced by Luther Vandross
Albums produced by Marcus Miller